Strawberry Shortcake Meets the Berrykins is a 1985 American animated television special that premiered on March 29, 1985. This is the third and final Strawberry Shortcake television special from Nelvana and the last one to feature the American Greetings character until DIC revived the franchise for a new generation in 2003. Unlike the previous two specials, they were distributed by LBS Communications. However, the third special wasn't, instead being distributed in syndication.

In 1985, the special gained popularity in the United Kingdom when it was used as a theatrical featurette alongside the 1985 film The Care Bears Movie, premiering the same day that the special premiered, introducing the Strawberry Shortcake franchise to a British public who at the time were largely unaware of it.

Synopsis
Strawberry rids Strawberryland of a strange, horrible smelling purple cloud with the help of her new friends, the Berry Princess and her helpers, the Berrykins.

Strawberry Shortcake Meets The Berrykins featured the first (and only) animated appearance of new friend Banana Twirl, and the Berry Princess, mystical guardian of the sprite-like Berrykins.

Strawberry's friends Blueberry Muffin, Raspberry Tart, Lemon Meringue and Lime Chiffon were all featured in this special. However, they weren't merchandised as part of 1985's "Berrykins" line of dolls by Kenner. Furthermore, Mint Tulip, who was produced as a "Berrykins" doll, was the only one not to appear in this special.

Release
This special was released on VHS on March 13, 1992 by Family Home Entertainment.

References

External links
 
 
 
 TV.com entry

1985 films
1985 television specials
1980s American animated films
Animated television specials
Strawberry Shortcake films
Canadian animated television films
Nelvana television specials